The PWS-51 was a Polish sports plane of 1930, a single-engine low-wing monoplane, constructed by the Podlaska Wytwórnia Samolotów (PWS), that remained a prototype.

Design and development
The plane was designed in 1929 by Stanisław Cywiński in Podlaska Wytwórnia Samolotów, on factory's initiative, specially to participate in the Challenge 1930 international touring aircraft contest (along with PWS-50, PWS-52 and PWS-8). The plane was built with a financial help of LOPP organization and it was first flown in spring of 1930 by Franciszek Rutkowski in Biała Podlaska. It's noteworthy, that it was only 10 kg heavier, and its maximum speed was 15 km/h higher, than estimated.

Operational history
The prototype, with markings SP-ADC and contest number O7, took part in the Challenge 1930 international contest in July 1930, flown by Józef Lewoniewski. He completed most of a rally over Europe, but had to withdraw after a forced landing near Vienna on July 28, due to an oil pipe damage.

Later the plane took part in some competitions in Poland, without much success, among others it took the 10th place in the 3rd Polish Light Aircraft Contest in 1930. In 1931 during repair, a radial engine Genet was replaced with a radial engine Walter Vega NZ (from PWS-8 aircraft) with a Townend ring. It was used then by an Aviation Club of the PWS factory. In June 1933 the plane was damaged. During repair it was fitted with a straight engine Cirrus III (from broken up PWS-50 aircraft).

It crashed during the 4th Winter Air Contest of Lublin and Podlasie in 2–4 February 1934, flown by A. Uszacki, and was broken up.

Description
Single-engine mixed construction braced low-wing monoplane. Fuselage rectangular in cross-section, built on a steel frame, covered with canvas and aluminum in engine part. Rectangular two-section wings with rounded tips, two-spar, covered with plywood in forward part and canvas in a rear part, supported with upper struts. Crew of two, sitting in tandem in open cockpits with windshields, fitted with dual controls. A luggage compartment behind a cockpit. Conventional fixed landing gear, with a rear skid.

5-cylinder air-cooled radial engine Armstrong Siddeley Genet in front, 80 hp nominal power and 88 hp take-off power (later replaced with Walter Vega NZ 5-cylinder radial engine, 85 HP nominal power, and Cirrus III 4-cylinder straight engine, 85 HP nominal and 94 take-off power). Two-blade wooden propeller  of a fixed pitch. Fuel tank 100 L before a cockpit. Fuel consumption - 22 L/hour.

Specifications

References

Further reading

External links

Photos and drawings at Ugolok Neba

PWS-51
PWS-51
Single-engined tractor aircraft
Low-wing aircraft
Aircraft first flown in 1930